State Highway 27 is a state highway from Pune to Ahmednagar in the state of Maharashtra. The highway is the major link between the two cities. Since trains take about 4 hours to cover this distance, people prefer travelling by this highway, by which one can reach Ahmednagar within 2 hours.

Route
The highway connects Pune to Wagholi, Shikrapur, Ranjangaon, Shirur, Supa, Kedgaon and Ahmednagar.

Wagholi-Shikrapur flyover
This would cost  2500 crores. This is expected to have 1000 pillars.

References

Transport in Pune
State Highways in Maharashtra